Alexander Dmitryevich Ulybyshev or Alexandre Oulibicheff (Russian: Александр Дмитриевич Улыбышев) (1794-1858) was a wealthy landowner, an influential biographer of Wolfgang Amadeus Mozart and the most important early patron of Mily Balakirev.

Life
Ulybyshev was born in Dresden, the son of the Russian ambassador to the Electorate of Saxony. From 1816 to 1830 he served in the Russian Foreign Ministry, where his duties from 1825 to 1830 included editing the Journal de St.-Pétersbourg. He retired in 1830, with the rank of State Councillor.

He died at his estate in Lukino, near Nizhny Novgorod, on 24 January (Julian calendar; 5 February Gregorian calendar) 1858.

Writings
Ulybyshev's three-volume Nouvelle biographie de Mozart (Dresden, 1843) was influential on nineteenth-century perceptions of the composer. It was later translated into German, and into Russian by Modest Ilyich Tchaikovsky.

His views were attacked by Wilhelm von Lenz in Beethoven et ses trois styles (Paris, 1855), to which Ulybyshev retaliated with Beethoven, ses critiques et ses glossateurs (Leipzig and Paris, 1857).

He also wrote a number of articles on music for the Journal de St.-Pétersbourg.

Sources
 Geoffrey Norris and Edward Garden. "Ulïbïshev, Aleksandr Dmitryevich." Grove Music Online. Oxford Music Online. 26 May 2010.
 Profile of Ulybyshev, Apr. 4, 2006, by Voice of Russia.

External links
 Nouvelle biographie de Mozart at Google Books.
 Beethoven: ses critiques et ses glossateurs at Google Books.

1794 births
1858 deaths
Russian civil servants
Russian newspaper editors
Russian music critics
Russian landowners